Two ships of the United States Coast Guard or its antecedent services have borne the name Sherman, in honor of John Sherman (1823–1900), who was Secretary of the Treasury during the Hayes administration (1877–1881).

The vessel was then transferred to the Sri Lanka Navy and renamed SLNS Gajabahu (P626).

See also

References 

United States Coast Guard ship names